Ján Steinhübel (born 21 May 1957) is a Slovak historian who specializes in Great Moravia and in the origins of Kingdom of Hungary. He is best known for his work Nitrianske kniežatsvo ("Principality of Nitra") which summarizes his numerous studies and articles about the topic.

Selected works 
 1995 Veľkomoravské územie v severovýchodnom Zadunajsku [Great Moravian territory in northeastern Transdanubia]
 2003 Krátke dejiny Slovenska [Short history of Slovakia] (co-author)
 2004 Nitrianske kniežatstvo [Principality of Nitra]
 2011 Kapitoly z najstarších českých dejín 531 - 1004 [Chapters of the oldest Czech history 531 - 1004]

Awards 
 Prize of chairman of Nitra Self-governing Region for the exceptional historical work Principality of Nitra

References 

1957 births
20th-century Slovak historians
Living people
People from Modra
21st-century Slovak historians